Henri Marracq, (Pontacq, 21 November 1937 – 145 May 2003), was a French rugby dual-code international. he played for  France national rugby union team and for France national league team. With the latter, he played the  1968 Rugby League World Cup final against Australia

Player career

Clubs 

 Section Paloise
 RC Saint-Gaudens XIII
 Pau XIII

International (Rugby union) 
He first played a test match on 12 November 1961 against Romania in Bayonne, where he scored a try.

Honours

Club 

 Rugby union:
 Challenge Yves du Manoir :
 1 time finalist in 1962 (Pau).

 Rugby league:
 Rugby League World Cup :
 1 time finalist in 1968 (France).

 French Championship :
 1 time Champion in 1970 (Saint-Gaudens).
 6 times finalist in 1963, 1966, 1967, 1969, 1971 and 1972 (Saint-Gaudens).

International  (rugby league) 
He disputed 21 international matches between 1963 and 1969.

External links 

 
 

 Henri Marracq at rugbyleagueproject.com

Rugby union flankers
Section Paloise players
French rugby league players
French rugby union players
France international rugby union players
Sportspeople from Pyrénées-Atlantiques
1937 births
2003 deaths
Rugby league second-rows
Saint-Gaudens Bears players
Dual-code rugby internationals
People from Béarn
France national rugby league team players